A paintbrush is a brush used to apply paint or sometimes ink.

Paintbrush may also refer to:

Plants
 Castilleja (commonly "Indian paintbrush"), a genus of about 200 species of annual and perennial herbaceous plants
 Haemanthus albiflos (sometimes "paintbrush"), a species of flowering plant in the family Amaryllidaceae, native to South Africa
 Haemanthus coccineus (also "paintbrush lily"), a bulbous geophyte in the genus Haemanthus, native to Southern Africa

Software
 Microsoft Paintbrush, former name of Microsoft Paint, a simple computer graphics app
 Paintbrush (software), a raster image editor for macOS
 PC Paintbrush, graphics editing software